The Pearlfishers are a Scottish, Glasgow-based rock band, fronted by the singer and songwriter David Scott, who have been described by acclaim.ca as "one of Scotland's best-kept musical secrets". Other contributors include drummer Jim Gash, Dee Bahl, Brian McAlpine, Mil Stricevic and Duglas T. Stewart, also of the BMX Bandits. The band's 2007 album, Up With the Larks, was named one of the top albums of 2007 by the Sunday Mail music critic, Billy Sloan. and their 2014 release "Open Up your Colouring Book" drew favourable comparisons to the work of Paul Simon and the Beach Boys.

Selected discography
 Sacred EP (My Dark Star, 1991)
 Hurt EP (My Dark Star, 1991)
 Woodenwire EP (My Dark Star, 1991)
 Saint Francis Songs EP (Iona Gold, 1993)
 Za Za's Garden (Iona Gold, 1993)
 Living in a Foreign Country EP (Iona Gold, 1994)
 The Strange Underworld of the Tall Poppies (Marina, 1997)
 Even on a Sunday Afternoon EP (Marina, 1997)
 Banana Sandwich EP (Marina, 1998)
 The Young Picnickers (Marina, 1999)
 Across The Milky Way (Marina, 2001)
 Sky Meadows (Marina, 2003)
 A Sunflower at Christmas EP (Marina, 2004)
 Up with the Larks (Marina, 2007)
 The Umbrellas of Shibuya 7" vinyl single (Marina, 2007)
 Open Up Your Colouring Book (Marina, 2014)
 Love and Other Hopeless Things (Marina, 2019)

References

External links
Pearlfishers official website
[ Biography at AllMusic.com]

Scottish rock music groups